It Matters to Me is the second studio album by American country music artist Faith Hill. It was released in August 1995 via Warner Bros. Records Nashville. Certified 4× Multi-Platinum by RIAA for shipments of four million copies, it produced five Top 10 singles on the Billboard Hot Country Songs charts: "Let's Go to Vegas", the title track, "Someone Else's Dream", "You Can't Lose Me", and "I Can't Do That Anymore".

Critical reception

Track listing

Personnel
Gary Carter – pedal steel guitar
Ashley Cleveland – background vocals
Bill Cuomo – synthesizer
Dan Dugmore – pedal steel guitar, lap steel guitar
Paul Franklin – pedal steel guitar
Trey Gray – drums
Lisa Gregg – background vocals
Rob Hajacos – fiddle
John Hobbs – piano, Hammond B-3 organ
Steve Hornbeak – background vocals
Dann Huff – electric guitar
Robert Johnson – background vocals
Anthony Joyner – bass guitar
Elaine Krisle – piano
Carl Marsh – synthesizer
Brent Mason – electric guitar
Wendell Mobley – background vocals
Matt Rollings – piano
Pam Rose – background vocals
Tom Rutledge – acoustic guitar
Michael Spriggs – acoustic guitar
Karen Staley – background vocals
Harry Stinson – background vocals
Russ Taff – background vocals
Lou Toomey – electric guitar
Billy Joe Walker Jr. – acoustic guitar
Cindy Richardson Walker – background vocals
Dennis Wilson – background vocals
Lonnie Wilson – drums
Glenn Worf – bass guitar
Reese Wynans – piano, Hammond B-3 organ

Hand claps on "Keep Walkin' On" performed by Mark Capps, Bill Cuomo, Paul Franklin, Darrell Franklin, Scott Hendricks, Faith Hill, Brent Mason, Michelle Perry, Michael Spriggs, Lonnie Wilson, and Glenn Worf.

Charts

Weekly charts

Year-end charts

Certifications

References

1995 albums
Faith Hill albums
Warner Records albums
Albums produced by Scott Hendricks